The 1980–81 Divisional Championship was the second edition of the tournament launched by the RFU to help prepare England players for test rugby and was contested across two weekends in December 1980.

Following its commencement in 1977, the Divisional Championship had had a two-season break owing to the demands of fixtures against touring teams, but returned in 1980–81.

The season's final was held on 20 December 1980 in poor weather conditions at Twickenham, and the North retained the title they won in 1977 with a 6–0 win over the Midlands. Earlier in the day London beat the South & South-West 13–4 in the play-off for third and fourth place.

Results

Semi-finals

3rd/4th play-off

Final

Report

The 1981-82 Rothmans Rugby Yearbook noted that the championship's final round of matches was ruined by weather variously described as 'vile' and 'unspeakable'. Only a small crowd braved the atrocious weather and witnessed players struggling to come to terms with the conditions. In a repeat of the tournament's previous final, the North once again beat the Midlands to retain the title they won at the inaugural staging of the competition in 1977–78.

The pitch was reported as "wet and muddy" and the difference between the teams identified as the North pack managing the conditions slightly better than their opponents under the guidance of England's Grand Slam captain Bill Beaumont. Penalty goals were kicked by North's Johnson and Patrick.

References

Divisional Championship (rugby union)
Divisional Championship